Yusuke Kizu (born 2 December 1995) is a Japanese rugby union player who generally plays as a prop represents Japan internationally and plays for Toyota Verblitz in the Japanese Top League. He was included in the Japanese squad for the 2019 Rugby World Cup which was held in Japan for the first time and for the first time in Asia.

Career 
He made his club debut for Toyota Verblitz in 2018. Yusuke made his international debut for Japan against Fiji on 27 July 2019 at the 2019 World Rugby Pacific Nations Cup round match where Japan defeated Fiji 34-21 and later Japan went onto win the tournament for the third time.

References

External links

Japanese rugby union players
Living people
1995 births
Sportspeople from Ōita Prefecture
Rugby union props
Toyota Verblitz players
Japan international rugby union players